The following is a timeline of the history of the city of Barcelona, Catalonia, Spain.

Prior 19th century

 218 BCE - Barcino established by Hamilcar Barca a Carthaginian general and statesman.
 133 BCE - Romans in power.
 343 CE - Bishopric established.
 414 - Visigoth Ataulphus headquartered in Barcelona.
 713 - Arabs in power.
 801 - Siege of Barcelona, Franks in power; County of Barcelona established.
 874 - The counts of Barcelona ruled as independent monarchs.
 897 - Guifré el Pilós, Count of Barcelona, dies with his sons inheriting his possessions instead of an appointment of the Frank's king, making the end of Franks rule (de facto)
 1164 - Dynastic union of Barcelona with Aragon (grand partner).
 1243 - Arsenals built (approximate date).
 1258 - Consolat de Mar (maritime legal code) issued.
 1298 - Barcelona Cathedral construction begins.
 1359 - June: Battle of Barcelona (1359).
 1378 - Casa Consistorial built.
 1383 - Llotja del Mar (exchange) built.
 1391 - Santa Maria del Pi church built.
 1392 - Public clock installed (approximate date).
 1400 - Medical college established.
 1401
 Taula de canvi (public bank) established.
 General hospital active.
 1448 = Barcelona Cathedral construction completed.
 1450 - University of Barcelona founded.
 1473 - Printing press in use.
 1474 - Moll de la Santa Creu (wharf) construction begins.
 1493 - Columbus' published description of his trans-Atlantic trip becomes a "bestseller" in Barcelona.
 1529 - Charles V and Clement VII sign treaty in Barcelona.
 1609 - Bank of Barcelona established.
 1641 - January: Battle of Montjuïc.
 1651 - July: Siege of Barcelona begins.
 1697 - August: Siege of Barcelona (1697).
 1705 - September–October: Siege of Barcelona (1705).
 1706 - April: Siege of Barcelona (1706).
 1708 - Premiere of Caldara's opera .(ca)
 1713 - July: Siege of Barcelona (1713–14) begins.
 1715 - Citadel built to suppress Catalan revolts (Ciutadella de Barcelona).
 1792 - Custom house built.

19th century

 1809 - French in power.
 1833 - City becomes capital of newly created Province of Barcelona.
 1834 -  established.
 1842 - Bombardment of Barcelona (1842).
 1847
 Gran Teatre del Liceu opens.
 Barcelona City Hall expanded.
 1848
 Mataró-Barcelona railway begins operating.
 Institut Industrial de Catalunya founded.
  moves into City Hall.
 1854 - City walls dismantled (approximate date).
 1857 - Population: 183,787.
 1859 - Floral Games begin.
 1869 - 25 September: "Republican insurrection."
 1877 - Parc de la Ciutadella established from the old citadel.
 1881
 La Vanguardia newspaper begins publication.
 Premiere of 's Catalan-language opera A la voreta del mar.
 1882 - Gaudi's Sagrada Família cathedral construction begins.
 1887 - Population: 272,481.
 1888 - 1888 Barcelona Universal Exposition held; Arc de Triomf and Castle of the Three Dragons built.
 1891 - Orfeó Català chorus formed.
 1897
 Eixample district laid out.
 Els Quatre Gats cafe in business.
 1899 - Futbol Club Barcelona formed.
 1900
 Picasso's first solo art exhibit held.
 Population: 533,000.

20th century

 1901 - Regionalist League headquartered in city.
 1903 - Palau Robert (residence) built on Passeig de Gràcia.
 1905 - Jaussely's city plan introduced.
 1906
 Republican Nationalist Centre and Catalan Solidarity (1906) headquartered in city.
 Catalan language congress held.
 1908
 Radical Republican Party headquartered in city.
 Palau de la Música Catalana (concert hall) opens.
 1909 - July: Tragic Week (Spain).
 1910
 Confederación Nacional del Trabajo (union) founded in Barcelona.
 Les Arts i les Artistes (group) formed.
 Gaudi's art nouveau Casa Milà built.
 1913
 Sants market built.
 Escola Catala d'Art Dramatic (school) established.
 1914
 National Library of Catalonia established.
 Park Güell built.
 1918 - Majestic Hotel Inglaterra in business.
 1919 - Danone yogurt manufactory turn business.
1919 -La Canadenca strike, a successful 44 day general strike for the 8-hour-day
 1920 - Population: 710,335.
 1921 - 8 March: Politician Dato assassinated.
 1922
 Publicat newspaper begins publication.
 Pathe Cinema opens.
 1923 - 13 September: Coup; Primo de Rivera in power.
 1924 - Barcelona Metro begins operating.
 1925 - Salvador Dalí's first solo art exhibit held.
 1929
 1929 Barcelona International Exposition held; Palau Nacional built.
 Cafe de l'Opera in business.
 1930 - Population: 1,005,565.
 1932
 Fira de Barcelona established.
 Le Corbusier's city plan introduced.
 1933 – Boadas bar in business.
 1934 - Cine Verdi opens.
 1936
 July 1936 military uprising in Barcelona.
 Cine New-York (cinema) opens.
 1937 - May Days.
 1938 - March: Bombing of Barcelona by nationalist forces.
 1939 - Franco in power.
 1943 - Barcelona City History Museum inaugurated.
 1948 - Dau al Set cultural group active.
 1957
 Estadi del FC Barcelona (stadium) opens.
 Josep Maria de Porcioles i Colomer becomes mayor.
 1963 - Museu Picasso opens.
 1968 - Instituto Politécnico Superior and La Claca puppet theatre established.
 1970 - Population: 1,745,142.
 1971 - Parc del Laberint d'Horta opens.
 1973 - Enric Massó i Vázquez becomes mayor.
 1974
 Barcelona Metropolitan Corporation created.
 Fundación Joan Miró built.
 1976 - Festival Grec de Barcelona begins.
 1978 - Barcelona International Centre of Photography inaugurated.
 1982 - Pasqual Maragall becomes mayor.
 1986 - Barcelona Metròpolis magazine begins publication and the city was chosen to host the 1992 Summer Olympics.
 1987 - Parc de la Creueta del Coll established. and the city sign an agreement to host the 1992 Summer Paralympics
 1989 - European Institute for the Mediterranean established.
 1990 - Population: 1,707,286.
 1992 - 1992 Summer Olympics and thr 1992 Summer Paralympics were held.
 1995 - Open University of Catalonia established.
 1997 - Joan Clos becomes mayor.
 1999 - L'Auditori opens and the Final of the UEFA Champions League at Camp Nou

21st century

 2004
 September: World Urban Forum held.
 2004 Universal Forum of Cultures held.
 Barcelona Institute of International Studies established.
 2006 - Jordi Hereu becomes mayor.
 2007 - Bicing bikeshare program launched.
 2008 
 Madrid–Barcelona high-speed rail line inaugurated
 Subway terror plot foiled
 2009 - W Barcelona Hotel built.
 2010
 10 July: 2010 Catalan autonomy protest.
 Sister city relationship established with San Francisco, California.
 2011
 Caixabank founded.
 Xavier Trias elected mayor.
 Population: 1,620,943.
 2012 - 11 September: 2012 Catalan independence demonstration.
 2015 - 24 May: Barcelona City Council election, 2015 held; Ada Colau elected mayor.
 2016 Barcelona Metro line 9 connecting to the airport finished
 2017 - 17 August: Barcelona attacks.
 2017: The Parliament of Catalonia declares the independence from Spain

See also
 History of Barcelona
 List of mayors of Barcelona
 Timeline of Catalan history

Other cities in the autonomous community of Catalonia:(ca)
 Timeline of Lleida

References

This article incorporates information from the Catalan Wikipedia and Spanish Wikipedia.

Bibliography

Published in the 19th century
 
 
 
 
 

Published in the 20th century
 
 
 
 
 
 
 
 
 

Published in the 21st century

External links

 Map of Barcelona, 1943
 Map of Barcelona, 1999
 Europeana. Items related to Barcelona, various dates.
 Digital Public Library of America. Items related to Barcelona, various dates
  (map)

 
 
Barcelona